Southwest Early College can refer to:
Southwest Early College (Denver, Colorado), a charter high school in Denver, Colorado, United States
Southwest Early College Campus, a high school in Kansas City, Missouri, United States